Ebensburg is a borough and the county seat of Cambria County in the U.S. state of Pennsylvania. Ebensburg is located in a rich bituminous coal region. In the past, sawmills, tanneries, wool mills, and a foundry operated there. The number of residents in 1900 was 1,574, and in 1910, 1,978. The population was 3,351 at the 2010 census. It is part of the Johnstown, Pennsylvania Metropolitan Statistical Area.

Ending in Ebensburg is the Ghost Town Trail, a rail trail established in 1991 on the right-of-way of the former Ebensburg and Black Lick Railroad. Also of note, next to the old Cambria County Jail, is the Veterans Park of Cambria County honoring the men from Cambria County who fought in the Revolutionary War, War of 1812, Mexican-American War, Civil War, and the Spanish-American War.

History 
Ebensburg originated in November 1796, when Congregational minister Rees Lloyd led a small party of 20 Welsh people from Philadelphia to the lands Morgan John Rhees had chosen for his colony. They selected an attractive spot in the tops of the Allegheny Mountains and there settled what would become Ebensburg, naming it for Eben Lloyd, who died in childhood. Lloyd offered land to the government in exchange for Ebensburg becoming the county seat, which the government accepted. A nearby settlement by the name of Beula, Pennsylvania sprouted just to the West of town with intentions of becoming the county seat. The town faded into obscurity and now all that remains is an old cemetery.

Ebensburg was described in the 1940 Pennsylvania guide as being:

According to the book Cambria County Pioneers (1910), a General William Rudolph Smith, son of William Rudolph Smith, and refereed to as "Captain" by residents, lived in the town of Ebensburg, Pennsylvania in the 1840s and raised a Company of men known as the Cambria Guards who would serve in the Mexican–American War, but Smith could not go.  He was "universally accepted as an authority in literary matters and upon historical subjects particularly he was a veritable encyclopedia. His literary style was forcible, direct, and elegant." The Company he raised would embark South in January 1847, becoming Company D of the Second Regiment of Pennsylvania Volunteers, called the Highlanders, and had "a very pleasant trip" on their way to New Orleans. They did not see combat until August that year as smallpox put the company in quarantine. Shortly after their release they saw heavy combat at Contreras, Churubusco, and Chapultepec. Following this they were encamped at a Monastery until 1848 when they returned to Ebensburg. Ebensburg is situated at a crossroads of roads heading North and South, and East to West. It has seen heavy traffic through its history but most significantly during the gold rush of the late 1840s and beyond. There was once a green apartment building situated on the corner of Phaney and East High Streets in town that was known as "The California House." It operated for years as an inn and tavern and housed thousands of travelers heading West to find their fortunes in the West. One young local boy called William J. Wherry joined a caravan West and left some detailed accounts of his journey in the form of letters to his sister, claiming to have crossed 600 miles of plain alone on his way there. But as the wagons of the West ran dry and transport evolved, the railroad was becoming a popular and efficient mode of transportation. Railroads were popular in the nearby town of Cresson, but there was no main line of railroad that ran through Ebensburg. However, a branch called the "Ebensburg Cresson Rail Road" was built in 1862 to run into Ebensburg. Many observed that Ebensburg, though industrious and sophisticated in character, was not going to be an industrial town given its location and geography.

During the Civil War, men from Ebensburg served in the 133rd Pennsylvania Volunteer Infantry (particularly companies A, B and F) and fought in Allabach’s brigade (Humphreys' 3rd Division) at Fredericksburg and Chancellorsville.  In the Battle of Fredericksburg on December 13, 1862, the 133rd participated in the final charge on Marye's Heights, suffering heavy losses. As well, Company A – known as the Cambria Guards – of the 11th Pennsylvania Reserves haled from Ebensburg and surrounding towns in Cambria County. This company was about 80 men strong, and its captain was Robert Litzinger of Ebensburg. The 11th Pennsylvania Reserves saw action at the Battle of South Mountain, The Battle of Antietam, and the Battle of Gettysburg. Particularly on the second days fight at Gettysburg, the 11th participated in a counter-assault down the face of Little Round Top into The Wheatfield to drive out Confederates. Ebensburg even had Medal of Honor recipients in the Civil War in the forms of Thomas Evans of Company D, and James Snedden from Company E of the 54th Pennsylvania. Evans "wrested the colors from a color bearer of a Tennessee regiment [sic], sending the color bearer to the rear." Evans is buried at Bethel Cemetery in Ebensburg.

Ebensburg did have its own connections to the Underground Railroad. Abraham A. Barker was well established in the towns, and nations abolitionist movement, he moved to town in 1856 to attempt to make it rich in Ebensburg's lucrative lumber industry. Barker lived in a log structure on the North West corner of Locust and High street. It was here that, prior to the Civil War, he assisted a slave on his escape to freedom, brought to him from Bedford. The fugitive stayed in his house overnight, and was brought a few miles out of Ebensburg the next morning, hidden under a buffalo robe on sled. Barker was, according to many towns folks, close friends with Abraham Lincoln as he had attended the Chicago Convention of 1860 to nominate Lincoln. Barker was later elected to congress.

In the years following the Civil War, Ebensburg flourished, became a town of posh propriety in a sense with grand homes flanking the streets, lavish carriages rolled down the roads, and even a debate club of local gentleman would meet in lounges across town. Still it was a mountain town, high in the Alleghenies, and many Pittsburgh socialites flocked here to escape the dirty, loud and sickly streets of the industrial city. Locals realized the towns allure and would write in promotional pamphlets describing the town as having "many days of bright sunshine, its pure artisan well water, its health giving atmosphere, its splendid surroundings - absolutely free from smoke and dust... the town is remarkably free from the ills which plague so many localities." This promise of healthy life in the high peaks of Ebensburg lured many who could afford "summer cottages" -though many are akin to mansions. The first wave of this tourism came as prominent hotels done in grandiose Victorian style began popping up across town. Such was the case of the Maple Park Springs Hotel which sat on a hill in the Northwest corner of town on a tract of land known as "Lloyds Grove." The Hotel was prominent enough that Altoona musician J.W. Leman wrote the "Maple Park March Two-Step" for the hotel. However, the townspeople started building their own Victorian homes, and the socialites came flooding in to claim their own slivers of mountain paradise. Among them, Ormsby Lodge owned by the Phillips Family. Built in 1889 by Duncan Phillips, the lodge was an 18 room East Lake Victorian cottage built on the former Belmont Tract of land. Summering at the estate was artist Marjorie Acker Phillips, wife of Duncan Phillips, with her family. Another summer cottage was the Bissel Home which was designed by architect Stanford White, who designed Madison Square Garden. David Park of Pittsburgh bought the Maple Park Springs Hotel and built his own mansion in town. The Johnstown Democrat wrote of the town around this time "that delightful village" of Ebensburg "In many respects is more attractive than Cresson... and it may be truthfully added that its complement of pretty girls is alone enough to give it enviable fame." It was also during this time of great prosperity that the city of Johnstown to the south was devastated by a flood in 1889, a stark contrast to the march of progress in the mountain town.

In February 1915 most of downtown Ebensburg was wiped out "by fire which broke out in the pool room of the Mountain House. Every building in the block from the Mountain House to the county court house was destroyed. The loss is estimated between $250,000 and $300,000. The court house was not damaged although the buildings adjoining were destroyed. Fire companies from many northern Cambria towns were summoned to assist the Ebensburg company. The Johnstown city fire department also went to the scene. The buildings destroyed include the fine building of the Cambria Savings and company, several hotels, a livery barn, a bank building and a number of small office buildings. The telephone communications were cut off. The buildings destroyed were thirteen in number. A cigarette dropped in the poolroom the night previous is believed to have started the fire." According to the Indiana Progress "Several buildings were dynamited to prevent the spread of the flames." Taking into consideration the lowest cost estimate of $250,000, in 2020 it would have cost  $6,402,920.79.

The Ebensburg Historic District was added to the National Register of Historic Places in 2019, which is bounded roughly by Highland Ave., West St., Sugar St., and Triumph St.

Art
Impressionist painter Marjorie Acker Phillips, who had a summer home in Ebensburg known as the Ormsby Lodge, is thought to have drawn inspiration from the nearby countryside for many of her paintings.

Education
In the borough of Ebensburg, there are three public and two private schools. The two private schools are Bishop Carroll High School and Holy Name Elementary. The public schools are Cambria High School, Central Cambria Middle School, and Cambria Elementary.

Geography
Ebensburg is located in the center of Cambria County at  (40.486388, -78.725461).

Three U.S. highways pass through and intersect around Ebensburg: U.S. Route 22 runs along the southern border of the borough, leading east  to Hollidaysburg, south of Altoona, and west  to Pittsburgh. U.S. Route 219 bypasses the borough to the west, with access from two exits (U.S. 22 and U.S. 422). US 219 leads north  to DuBois and south  to Somerset. Finally, the western portion of U.S. Route 422 begins at US 219 on the west side of Ebensburg and leads west  to the borough of Indiana.

Climate

Demographics

As of the census of 2010, there were 3,351 people and 1,612 households within the borough. The population density was 1,971.2 people per square mile (702.0/km2). There were 1,742 housing units at an average density of 1,024.7 per square mile (334.8/km2). The racial make-up of the borough was 98.27% White, 0.48% African American, 0.69% Asian, 0.12% Native American, 0.01% from other races, and 0.36% from two or more races. Hispanic or Latino of any race were 0.48% of the population.

There were 1,612 households, out of which 22.7% had children under the age of 18 living with them, 48.3% were married couples living together, 9.1% had a female householder with no husband present, and 39.3% were non-families. 35.3% of all households were made up of individuals, and 17.3% had someone living alone who was 65 years of age or older. The average household size was 2.23 and the average family size was 2.90.

In the borough the population was spread out, with 19.2% under the age of 18, 1.9% from 18 to 19, 6.4% from 20 to 24, 12.9% from 25 to 34, 17.4% from 35 to 49, 21.7% from 50 to 64, and 20.5% who were 65 years of age or older. The median age was 42 years. The population was 46.55% male, and 53.45% female.

Law and government

Borough Officials

Council

State Senate

State House of Representatives

Notable buildings 

 A.W. Buck House
 Cambria County Courthouse
 Cambria County Jail
 Ormsby Lodge
 Philip Noon House

Notable people
 Abraham A. Barker, a congressman, abolitionist, and conductor on the Underground Railroad. 
Alan Baylock, jazz composer, band leader, chief arranger, US Air Force Airmen of Note
 Jack Darragh (1866–1939), baseball player
 Webster Davis (1861–1923), mayor of Kansas City, Missouri and Assistant Secretary of the Interior 
 Ronald Duman (1954–2020), psychiatry professor and director of pharmacology
 Alvin Evans (1845–1906), congressman
 Bill Hartack (1932–2007), Hall of Fame jockey
 James Russell Leech (1888–1952), congressman
Carol Scott (1949–2005), television producer and director
 Harriet B. Jones (1856–1943), physician and member of the West Virginia House of Delegates
 Harve Tibbott (1885–1969), congressman
 Samuel D. Pryce (1841–1923), Businessman, author, and Civil War officer
 William Pryce (1932–2006), U.S. Ambassador to Honduras

References

External links
 Ebensburg official website

County seats in Pennsylvania
Populated places established in 1796
Boroughs in Cambria County, Pennsylvania
1825 establishments in Pennsylvania